Only Human is a 2010 Irish experimental film directed by Rouzbeh Rashidi that tells the visual story of five couples. A tale of people unfolds under the night sky. These doomed couples and lost individuals begin journeys and attempt to find resolution in their lives. As the stories progress, they become neatly woven into a minimalistic portrayal of modern life.

Production
Rouzbeh Rashidi made this film on a low budget and a total cast and crew of ten people, including the actors and actresses. There was no script or pre-writing planning for this film and all of the shots were taken only one time without any rehearsal or repetition. Rouzbeh Rashidi shot the thirteen sequences of the film over a year, edited them individually and compiled them together for final version of the film. There is strong usage of Direct Cinema and cinéma vérité techniques in the film and sometimes actors weren't even aware that they were being filmed. Only Human is in black and white.

Reception
Only Human premiered in Swansea Bay Film Festival 2010 and was nominated for Best Film in Avant-garde category. The film also screened at The Flat Lake Festival 2010.

References

External links
 
 Review of the film Only Human (2009) By Bill Mousoulis

English-language Irish films
Films set in Ireland
Irish avant-garde and experimental films
2010 films
Irish black-and-white films
2010s English-language films